William J. Press (born 29 January 1881, date of death unknown) was a British wrestler who competed in the 1908 Summer Olympics, where he won the silver medal in the freestyle wrestling bantamweight class.

References

External links
 

1881 births
Year of death missing
Olympic wrestlers of Great Britain
Wrestlers at the 1908 Summer Olympics
British male sport wrestlers
Olympic silver medallists for Great Britain
Olympic medalists in wrestling
Medalists at the 1908 Summer Olympics